Eike-Henner Kluge  is the first expert witness in medical ethics recognized by Canadian courts. Dr. Kluge has acted as an expert witness in Alberta, British Columbia, and Ontario. He is known for his work on contentious medical ethics issue such as abortion and the ethics of deliberate death in addition to privacy and medical informatics. He established and was the first director of the Canadian Medical Association Department of Ethics and Legal Affairs. Dr. Kluge is the author of the International Medical Informatics Association's code of ethics and their ethics handbook. Additionally, he is a fellow in the Royal Society of Canada.

Abortion 
While the director of the Canadian Medical Association ethics and legal affairs, Dr. Kluge in 1991 drafted an analysis for a Senate committee about Bill C-43, which would sentence doctors to two years in jail for performing abortions where a woman's health is not at risk. Kluge viewed that the bill was flawed ethically. His presentation may have swayed two votes to change resulting in an unprecedented tied vote in January 1991 which resulted in the Senate not passing the Bill C-43.

Deliberate Death 
He was an expert witness in Rodriguez v British Columbia (AG) which was the first case to challenge section 241(b) of the Criminal Code and Carter v Canada (AG). Dr Kluge acted as ethics advisor to Sue Rodriguez. He argues that, "there is no right to die—but there is a right to shape and end our lives in keeping with our competently-held values...It is all a matter of autonomy, beneficence and non-malfeasance." Eike-Henner was also an expert witness in Carter v Canada (AG).

Law School Admission Council Investigation 
Dr Kluge's complaint to the Office of the Privacy Commissioner of Canada lead to the Law School Admission Council's no longer being able to fingerprint LSAT test takers in Canada.

Publications

Books 
 William of Ockham’s Commentary on Porphyry: Introduction and English Translation (serialised in Franciscan Studies, 1973-74). 
 The Practice of Death (1975) 
 The Metaphysics of Gottlob Frege: An Essay in Ontological Reconstruction (1980)
 The Ethics of Deliberate Death (1981)
 New human reproductive technologies : a preliminary perspective of the Canadian Medical Association (1991)
 Readings in Biomedical Ethics:  A Canadian Focus  {1993; 1999; 2004)
 The Ethics of Electronic Patient Records (2001)
 A Handbook of Ethics for Health Informatics Professionals  2003) 
 Ethics in Health Care: A Canadian Focus (2013)
 Ethics for Health Informatics Professionals: The IMIA Code,its Meaning and Implications (2016)
 The Electronic Health Record: Ethical Considerations (2020)
 The Right to Healthcare: Ethical Considerations (2022)

Co-author books 
 Withholding Treatment from Defective Newborn Children (1985)
 Home telehealth for chronic disease management (2008)

Documentaries 
 Shadow Company (2006) - As Self - Professor of Ethics

Selected academic works 
 
Kluge, Eike-Henner W. (2000), "Assisted Suicide, Ethics and the Law: The Implication of Autonomy and Respect for Persons, Equality and Justice, and Beneficence", in Prado, C. G. (ed.), Assisted Suicide: Canadian Perspectives, Ottawa, Canada: University of Ottawa Press, p. 83

References 

Health law in Canada
Canadian abortion law
Bioethicists
Year of birth missing (living people)
Living people